Polychlorinated diphenyl ethers (PCDEs) are structurally similar to polychlorinated biphenyls (PCBs), both which may be toxic polyhalogenated compounds and some PCDE congeners have been reported to cause toxic responses similar to those caused by some of the non-ortho-substituted PCBs, which are mediated by the aryl hydrocarbon receptor (AhR).

Congeners
The family of PCDEs consists of 209 possible substances, which are called congeners.

See also
 Polybrominated diphenyl ethers

References

Chloroarenes
Immunotoxins